Jean-Paul Chifflet (3 September 1949 – 25 May 2017) was a French banker. He served as the Chief Executive Officer of Crédit Agricole.

Biography

Early life
Jean-Paul Chifflet was born in 1949 in Tournon-sur-Rhône, Ardèche, France. He grew up on a farm. He failed his Baccalauréat twice and passed it the third time. He graduated from the Institut des Hautes Finances de Paris. He played rugby union for FC Tournon-Tain.

Career
In 1973, at the age of twenty-four, he joined Crédit Agricole. On 1 March 2010 he became its CEO, replacing Georges Pauget. As a result, he also became Chairman of Amundi and Pacifica.

Chifflet died on 25 May 2017 when he fell from his self-propelled tractor while mowing his lawn.

References

1949 births
2017 deaths
People from Tournon-sur-Rhône
French bankers
Chevaliers of the Légion d'honneur
Knights of the Ordre national du Mérite
Accidental deaths in France
Accidental deaths from falls